The Honda CBR900RR, or FireBlade in some countries, is a   sport bike, part of the CBR series introduced in 1992 by Honda.  It was the first of a series of large-displacement Honda models to carry the RR suffix.  The development of the first generation CBR900RR was led by Tadao Baba.

History

CBR900RR (893cc) SC28
The first generation CBR900RR was introduced in 1992 with an  inline-four engine. It set a precedent for lightweight in the superbike class, being much lighter than other large-displacement bikes of the time. The CBR900RR was based on an advanced research stage model known within Honda as the "CBR750RR". With the objective of equaling the acceleration of competitors’ flagship sport bikes, Honda increased the stroke of its inline 4-cylinder 750 cc engine and thus raised displacement to 893cc. Complementing its power performance was the bike's dry weight of just 185 kg, wheelbase of 1,405 mm, and a body almost identical to that of the advanced research stage model.

Changes for the 1994 model comprise a new shift-drum to improve notchy gear shifts. The second-generation CBR900RR, which debuted in 1995, incorporated changes in damping rates and spring rates. The front fork was upgraded with a compression adjuster. The upper cowl stay went from steel to aluminum, and the cylinder head cover went from aluminum to magnesium. The styling of the bike also became more aggressive: The independent dual lights became irregular-shaped multi-reflector lights known as "fox eyes" set further back and covered to improve aerodynamics, and the bike had fewer of the RR's unique fairing "speed" holes. The footpegs were firmer and slimmer like that of the RC45 and the reversed pedal on the original was replaced with a shift linkage. Instead of measuring speed from the front wheel, the speed is measured from the countershaft sprocket with an electronic speedometer.

CBR900RR (919cc) SC33 
1996 brought major changes to the CBR900RR with the third generation CBR900RR. To optimize rigidity Honda revised the suspension and chassis. Larger thinner-walled extrusions for more torsional rigidity were used in the swingarm and frame,  revised shock and fork internals, and  raised swingarm pivot. Other revisions included a smaller alternator, the addition of a throttle position sensor, extra clutch plates, and a larger exhaust. 

The only changes for the 1997 model were graphics and color options.

In 1998, Honda continued subtle refinements in the fourth generation CBR900RR's chassis. Brakes got larger rotors on the front and new calipers and ergonomics were revised with raised footpegs. The engine got revised with 80 percent new internals in an effort to reduce friction and weight. Cylinders bore got an aluminum composites treatment and new pistons. It also got a larger radiator and a new exhaust header in stainless steel.

CBR929RR (929cc) SC44
The fifth-generation CBR900RR, or CBR929RR in North America, was introduced in 2000. It has a completely new  engine, more oversquare with lighter internals. The engine also featured fuel injection and larger valves set at a narrower angle. A new all-titanium exhaust system equipped with HTEV was incorporated. The swingarm is mounted to the engine with bracing under the engine. Larger front disk rotors 330 mm mounted were also fitted and the wheel diameter was increased from 16 inches to 17 inches. The new front fork now used upside-down construction.

CBR954RR (954cc) SC50
The sixth generation CBR900RR, or CBR954RR in North America and Japan, was introduced in 2002. Larger fuel injectors, larger radiator, re-mapped electronic fuel injection, and a more powerful ECU were added. The restyled bodywork and fairings gave a sleeker look. The frame as well as the swingarm were strengthened, and the footpegs raised to allow for greater lean angles. Front disc size increased to 330 mm.

John McGuinness won the Macau Grand Prix in 2001 riding a CBR954RR.

Successor
The CBR900RR was replaced by the CBR1000RR in 2004.

Specifications
All specifications are manufacturer claimed unless specified.

References

External links

CBR900RR
Sport bikes
Motorcycles introduced in 1992